Hangkonghangtiandaxue is a station on Line 2 of the Shenyang Metro. The station opened on 30 December 2013. The station is named after the nearby Shenyang Aerospace University.

Station Layout

References 

Railway stations in China opened in 2013
Shenyang Metro stations